Viken is a county under disestablishment in Eastern Norway that was established on 1 January 2020 by the merger of Akershus, Buskerud and Østfold with the addition of three other municipalities. Viken was controversial from the onset, with an approval rating of about 20% in the region, and the merger was resisted by all the three counties. Viken has been compared to gerrymandering. The county executive of Viken determined in 2019, before the merger had taken effect, that the county's disestablishment is its main political goal, and the formal process to dissolve Viken was initiated by the county executive in right after the 2021 Norwegian parliamentary election in which parties seeking to reverse the merger won a majority. The political platform of the government of Jonas Gahr Støre states that the government will dissolve Viken and re-establish Akershus, Buskerud and Østfold based on a request from the county itself. On 22 February 2022, the regional assembly of Viken approved the formal request to disestablish the county, which will come into effect on 1 January 2024.

Viken was home to over 1.2 million people, or 23% of the national population. The county seat is the national capital, Oslo, which is an enclave of Viken and is not part of the county. Oslo had been the seat of Akershus county since the Middle Ages. All of Viken is located in the historical Akershus, which included much of Eastern Norway. The county takes its name from the historical region of Viken, which has been defined as an area in Bohuslän, in what is now western Sweden, since the Middle Ages.

Viken's creation and name are subjects of strong controversy, and the merger is opposed by the counties concerned and perceived as lacking legitimacy. The elected regional assembly and county executive of Viken have declared the disestablishment of Viken in 2021 as the main political goal of Viken and have refused to do anything to merge the counties in practice. The governing platform of Viken describes the merger as "an ill-considered construction". In practice, the existing counties will continue to function with separate county administrations based on their existing infrastructure in anticipation of their formal re-establishment.

In the 2021 parliamentary election, parties seeking to dissolve Viken won a majority, and the Centre Party made the disestablishment of Viken a condition for participating in a new government. Immediately after the election, the county executive initiated the process to dissolve Viken.

History
Viken was formed in 2020 by the merger of the counties Akershus, Buskerud, and Østfold. After the elected regional assemblies had voted against the proposed merger, a narrow majority of the right-wing parties in the Storting voted in 2017 to merge the counties in 2020 by force; in addition, the Storting voted to include Svelvik municipality from Vestfold, and Jevnaker and Lunner municipalities from Oppland.

Viken county takes its name from the historic region of Viken, which during the Viking Age loosely referred to the areas around the Oslofjord but became synonymous with Bohuslän (now in Sweden) during the Middle Ages. In Norway, the use of the name Viken was revived only by the fascist Nasjonal Samling during the Second World War to draw parallels to the Viking Age. It referred to Vestfold and Buskerud as Vest-Viken and Akershus (including most of modern Oslo) and Østfold as Øst-Viken. The new Viken county does not include large parts of the historical Viken, including the region's historical centre Bohuslän, most of Vestfold or Oslo. Viken County decided that the interim county capital will be Oslo.

"Sannermandering" debate
Viken has been described, such as by the director of Oslo Museum Lars Roede, as an example of Sannermandering, named after the minister responsible, Jan Tore Sanner, and modelled after the term gerrymandering. Roede described Viken as "an extreme monstrosity that flies in the face of geography and history" that is "reminiscent of manipulated electoral districts in the United States" and deeply unpopular in the affected regions. Roede also criticised "the amateurish logos and unhistorical names".

Dissolution
Viken county is widely perceived as lacking legitimacy, with an approval rating of 20% in the region, and is opposed by the former counties concerned. A common complaint is the inclusion of inland mountain areas like Ål and Hemsedal, which lack a cultural connection to the Oslofjord area. Another common complaint is the non-inclusion of Oslo although it has been the capital of Akershus since the Middle Ages and is the county that has the closest ties to Akershus. Most of Akershus is part of the Oslo metropolitan area. On 1 October 2019, the newly-elected governing majority parties in the planned county declared their intention of seeking to dissolve Viken and to re-establish the counties of Akershus, Buskerud and Østfold. The current official governing platform of Viken county states, "Viken is an ill-considered construction. The Storting has merged Akershus, Buskerud and Østfold against their will". It declares that the disestablishment of Viken is the main political goal of the county administration. For the same reason, the county council decided that it will not do anything to merge the counties in practice or establish a common county administration. Instead, the existing counties will continue to function at their current locations in anticipation of their formal re-establishment.

In the 2021 parliamentary election, the parties that seek to dissolve Viken won a majority, and the Centre Party made the disestablishment of Viken a condition for participating in a new government. Immediately after the election, the county executive initiated the formal process to dissolve Viken.

Coat of arms
The county coat of arms was adopted in 2020 and based on a citizen's proposal. Therefore, it bears no resemblance to older heraldic arms from the area. The historian Lars Roede criticised the coat of arms as an "amateurish logo" and wrote that the coat of arms "does not adhere to the requirements of good heraldry" and so would have been rejected by heraldic experts in the National Archives. He stated that "looks like three flying saucers under [a] cap" and is "a logo, not a heraldic coat of arms".

Geography

Mountains
Glitrehøgda
Gunnarshaugen
Hadelandshøgda
Paradiskollen

Municipalities
Viken County has a total of 51 municipalities, all created in 2020:

References

 
Counties of Norway
2020 establishments in Norway
Gerrymandering
States and territories established in 2020